Trapelia thieleana is a lichenised fungus in the family, Trapeliaceae. It was first described in 2014 by the mycologists, Gintaras Kantvilas, Steven Leavitt, John Elix and Thorsten Lumbsch. 

It has been found in mallee woodland, on loose stones and outcrops of ironstone, in Western Australia, and on Kangaroo Island in South Australia.

It is distinguishable from T. coarctata by the bright yellow pigment patches on its upper surface.

References

External links
Trapelia thieleana: Occurrence data from GBIF
List of Australian lichens

Taxa named by John Alan Elix
Lichen species
Lichens described in 2014
Taxa named by Gintaras Kantvilas
Taxa named by Helge Thorsten Lumbsch
Baeomycetales